The 2015 Georgia Tech Yellow Jackets football team represented the Georgia Institute of Technology in the 2015 NCAA Division I FBS football season. The Yellow Jackets were led by eighth-year head coach Paul Johnson and played their home games at Bobby Dodd Stadium. They were a member of the Coastal Division in the Atlantic Coast Conference. They finished the season 3–9, 1–7 in ACC play to finish in last place in the Coastal Division, losing six games by a margin of just seven points or less.

The season is perhaps best remembered for the “Miracle on Techwood,” in which the Yellow Jackets defeated No. 9 Florida State on a blocked field goal return for a touchdown as time expired. The defeat was the Seminoles’ first ACC loss in 1,113 days.

Before the season

Previous season
Georgia Tech won its first five games of the previous season, which included comeback victories over Georgia Southern and Virginia Tech, and an end of a five-game losing streak to Miami. After losing back-to-back games to Duke and North Carolina, the Yellow Jackets won out the rest of its regular season, which was capped off with a 30-24 overtime victory over Georgia. The Yellow Jackets represented the Coastal Division in the ACC Championship Game, where they were defeated by Atlantic Division champions Florida State. The Yellow Jackets would be invited to the Orange Bowl, where they defeated Mississippi State 49-34. Georgia Tech ended the season with an 11-3 record and a #8 ranking in the final AP Poll. Georgia Tech also had 3-1 record against top 25 ranked teams, including 2-0 record against SEC teams ranked in top 10.

Preseason
Head coach Paul Johnson returns for his eighth year at the helm of the program. Justin Thomas, who was Georgia Tech's starting quarterback in 2014, returns for his redshirt junior year.

Recruiting class

Spring game

Coaching staff

Schedule

Schedule source:

Rankings

References

Georgia Tech
Georgia Tech Yellow Jackets football seasons
Georgia Tech Yellow Jackets football